Juniorpress is a Dutch publisher well known for publishing translations into Dutch of U.S.-comics. It published Marvel, Image and DC/Cliffhanger comics under its own name, but used Baldakijn Boeken for the publication of DC-superhero comics such as Batman, Superman and the New Teen Titans.

Juniorpress published Marvel Comics in the Netherlands and Belgium between 1978 and 2007. Juniorpress lost the rights to publish Marvel Comics in 2007 to Z-Press. Panini, responsible for awarding the license, cited the business plan that Z-Press had put together and the publishing plan that they had suggested were much larger than the ones that Juniorpress had been doing for years now.

References

Publishing companies of the Netherlands